Luis Miguel Romero Fernández M.Id, (born June 16, 1954) is a Spanish prelate of the Roman Catholic Church who has been serving as an auxiliary bishop for the Diocese of Rockville Centre in New York since 2020.

Biography

Early life 
Romero was born on June 16, 1954, in Palencia, Spain, Spain, and raised in Huelva, Spain. He entered the Idente Missionaries in 1972. 

Romero was ordained to the priesthood in Tenerife, Spain, by Archbishop Paul Karatas for the Indente Missionaries Order on September 11, 1981. He received a doctorate in medicine from the University of Zaragoza in Zaragoza, Spain, in 1987.

Romero worked for 25 years in Latin America, including a stint from 1996 to 2009 as chancellor and rector-chancellor of the Universidad Técnica Particular de Loja in San Cayetano Alto, Ecuador. In 2007, Romero was named president of the Organización Universitaria Interamericana (Inter-American Organization for Higher Education).In December 2019, Romero was named vicar of Hispanic ministry for the Diocese of Rockville Centre in Long Island, New York.

Auxiliary Bishop of Rockville Centre 
Pope Francis appointed Romero as auxiliary bishop of the Diocese of Rockville Centre and titular bishop of Egara on March 3, 2020. His consecration as bishop, initially scheduled for April 16, 2020, was postponed due to the COVID-19 pandemic.  He was consecrated as a bishop by Bishop John Barres on June 29, 2020.

See also

 Catholic Church hierarchy
 Catholic Church in the United States
 Historical list of the Catholic bishops of the United States
 List of Catholic bishops of the United States
 Lists of patriarchs, archbishops, and bishops

References

External links

Roman Catholic Diocese of Rockville Centre Official Site
http://www.catholic-hierarchy.org/bishop/bromfer.html

1954 births
Living people
People from Palencia
Roman Catholic Diocese of Rockville Centre
21st-century Roman Catholic bishops in the United States
Spanish Roman Catholic bishops in North America
Bishops appointed by Pope Francis